Caloptilia obliquatella is a moth of the family Gracillariidae. It is known from Japan (Honshū) and Korea.

The wingspan is 11–13 mm.

The larvae feed on Quercus species, including Quercus acutissima. They mine the leaves of their host plant.

References

obliquatella
Moths of Asia
Moths described in 1931
Taxa named by Shōnen Matsumura